Virginia Minnetti (born July 1, 1949 in Canzo), best known by her stage name Viola Valentino, is an Italian singer.

Biography

Minnetti started her career as a singer in 1968 under the name Virginia and later began to sing with her then husband in a duet named Renzo & Virginia. Some time later Virginia was noticed by Giancarlo Lucariello, a producer of the Italian rock band Pooh. It was he who created an image of a sexy but delicate woman for her as well as her manner to sing with a subdued voice.

In 1979, Virginia started singing under the name Viola Valentino. Her first song Comprami ("Buy Me") made her famous and was sold in a great number of copies in Italy and Spain.

In 1980, Viola sang two other songs that also become hits, Sei una bomba ("You Are a Bomb") and Anche noi facciamo pace ("We Will Make Peace Too"). In the same year, her first album Cinema ("Cinema") came out.

In 1982, Viola Valentino took part in Festival di Sanremo for the first time with the song Romantici ("Romantic") which also became a hit. In the same year, her second album In primo piano ("In the Foreground") and another hit Sola ("Alone") came out. At that time, Viola Valentino was in the zenith of her fame and was invited to act in the film Delitto sull’autostrada ("A Crime on a Highway").

In 1983, she took part in Festival di Sanremo again with the song Arriva arriva ("Come, Come"). Since then, the public interest in Viola Valentino began to fade. In the 1980s, Viola acted in the films Due strani papà ("Two Strange Daddies", 1983) and Le volpi della notte ("Night Foxes", 1986).

In 1986, Viola sang Il posto della luna ("The Place of the Moon"), which had moderate success.

In 1991, an album Un angelo dal cielo ("An Angel from Heaven") came out which included the best songs by Viola Valentino.
In 2005 she went to the reality show Musicfarm.

Interesting facts

For some time, Viola Valentino was married to a well-known Italian singer Riccardo Fogli, which contributed to her popularity; later, however, they divorced.

Two times Viola's photos were cover photos of Playboy.

Filmography

Discography

Albums 

 1978 – Uno (with the band Fantasy)
 1980 – Cinema
 1982 – In primo piano
 1991 – Un angelo dal cielo
 1994 – Esisto
 1998 – Il viaggio
 2004 – Made in Virginia
 2010 – Alleati non-ovvi

EPs 
 1985 – L’angelo
 2009 – I tacchi di Giada

Singles 

 1968 – Dixie/Pensandoci su (under the name Virginia)
 1970 – Zan zan/I 10 comandamenti dell’amore (under the name Renzo e Virginia, together with Riccardo Fogli)
 1978 – Cantando (under the name Fantasy)
 1979 – Comprami/California
 1980 – Sei una bomba/Sono così
 1980 – Anche noi facciamo pace/Sì mi va
 1981 – Giorno popolare/Prendiamo i pattini
 1981 – Sera coi fiocchi/Come un cavallo pazzo
 1982 – Romantici/Rido
 1982 – Sola/Amiche
 1983 – Arriva arriva/Balere
 1984 – Verso sud/Traditi
 1985 – Addio amor
 1986 – Il posto della luna/La verità
 1987 – Devi ritornare/Dentro una notte di festa
 1991 – Un angelo dal cielo/Quasi mezzanotte
 1994 – Me marito se n'è ito
 1994 – Onda tra le onde
 1995 – Probabilmente niente
 1996 – Estasi
 1997 – Anime d’autunno (Libertango)
 1998 – Come quando fuori piove
 1999 – Aspettando Elia
 2000 – Comprami 2000 con Zerodecibel
 2002 – La surprise de l’amour
 2004 – Dea
 2004 – Acqua, fuoco, aria, terra
 2006 – Barbiturici nel thè

External links
 Official website (in Italian)

1952 births
Living people
Italian women singers
Italian pop singers